"Year of the Lover" is a song by American R&B recording artist Lloyd, released as the third and final single from his third studio album Lessons in Love (2008). The song was produced by Eric Hudson and written by Rico Love. It was sent to U.S. radio stations on July 10, 2009. The single was only released in the United States, where it only reached #101 on Billboard Hot R&B/Hip-Hop Songs chart. Although the song was a favorite among many, the single lacked promotion and didn't receive a music video. The single version features rapper Plies. Both Plies and Fabolous was featured on the song in Lessons in Love 2.0. Other remixes come from Rock City.

Chart position

References

2008 singles
2008 songs
Lloyd (singer) songs
Plies (rapper) songs
Universal Music Group singles
Songs written by Rico Love
Songs written by Eric Hudson